The so-called Pett Dynasty was a family of shipwrights who prospered in England between the 15th and 17th centuries. It was once said of the family that they were "so knit together that the Devil himself could not discover them". This saying refers to the era during which Samuel Pepys was much involved in getting royal aid for Ann Pett, widow of Christopher Pett. The Petts Wood district of south-east London is named for the family.

The Pett Family Tree

The four Peter Petts
Peter Pett, Master Shipwright of Deptford, was granted a Coat of Arms in 1563. His son, Joseph Pett of Limehouse, succeeded his father as Master Shipwright before Peter's death in 1605. Joseph surveyed the timber for the construction of a ship named Sovereign of the Seas, and married Elizabeth, daughter of Richard Hoborn, another shipwright and churchwarden at Chatham. Joseph died in 1652, aged about 60. Joseph's son, the second Peter Pett, carried on the private family business of shipbuilding at Wapping. Joseph's other son, also named Joseph, became the master carpenter employed at Chatham in 1643 by the then Earl of Warwick.

Another son of the first Peter Pett was Richard Pett, who raised his son (Peter of Deptford (1593–1652) and the third Peter Pett) to be a shipwright. The sons of this Peter Pett were Phineas (a captain in the Royal Navy) and another Peter (the fourth).

This fourth Peter was baptised in St Nicholas' Church in 1630, and was later educated in St Paul's School and Sidney Sussex College of Cambridge, where he was admitted in 1645. He then graduated to Pembroke College, Oxford, and in 1648 was elected to a fellowship at All Soul's College. He was bachelor of civil law to Gray's Inn from 1657 to 1658, and was knighted in 1661, after which he sat as a member of parliament for Askaeton in the Irish Parliament. He was called to the bar in 1664, as a barrister in law of the Middle Temple, and one of the original Fellows of the Royal Society in 1663, from which he was later expelled in 1675 for "not performing his obligations to the society". He also became Advocate-General in Ireland, before his death in 1699. Peter was a learned author and many of his manuscripts have survived him.

Phineas Pett, designer of the Sovereign of the Seas
Phineas Pett succeeded shipwright John Holding in the post of keeper of the plank yard, but his income was meagre by the standards set by his family. In his diary, he recorded that it became his duty, for which he considered himself unfit, to take charge of the affairs of his "poor sisters and brother." Phineas thought that his kinsman Joseph should have paid more attention to their plight, but he "cared not what became of them".

The Autobiography of Phineas Pett indicates his pride in the coat of arms of his father Peter. Phineas' son Peter, commissioner of Chatham, was disgraced because of the Battle of Medway and the loss of capital ships almost 100 years later. These arms display three black balls rather than the three R's of the Leicestershire Pates. The significance of the balls is made clear in some versions of this arms, which show below them a scuttled frigate. The lion passant shown on some versions indicates the Pett (Paetus (founders of Padua), Pettus) origins in Venice (colony of Padua), seafarer home of St. Mark, who is identified with a lion.

Peter Pett, in his application for arms, explicitly indicates his descent from Thomas Pett of Skipton.

Joseph Pett of Limehouse, Master Shipwright
As noted above, Joseph Pett of Limehouse became Master Shipwright in 1589, before his father Peter's death. He was the father of Joseph Pett of Chatham and had another son, William, and a daughter, Lydia, who took up the trade of her father and is a rare example of a female master tradesman of the era. He was married twice, first to Margaret Curtis (who died in 1594), and later to Margaret Humphrey (who died in 1612). Joseph died in 1605.

Details of Pett families

Family 1
Joseph Pett of Chatham St. Mary, Assistant Master Shipwright (1643–52), born ca. 1592, died ca. 1652, married to Elizabeth Hoborn (born/baptised 5 December 1615, St. Mary, Gillingham Green, died 23 July 1667, daughter of Richard Hoborn, shipwright of Chatham, and Margaret)
Children of Joseph and Elizabeth Pett:
Joseph, baptised 4 April 1630
Peter, baptised 18 November 1632
Rose, baptised 8 May 1639/buried ca. 1640/48
Margaret, baptised 19 December 1641
Elizabeth, baptised 5 August 1645
Samuel, baptised 14 November 1647
Thomas, baptised 16 April 1650

Family 2
Peter Pett, married 1st Elizabeth Paynter, 2nd Elizabeth Thornton
Children of Peter Pett and his first wife, Elizabeth Paynter:
Joseph, of Limehouse, died 1605, married Margaret (unknown maiden name)
Children of Joseph and Margaret Pett:
William
William, of Limehouse, Assistant Master Shipwright/Master Shipwright, born or baptised 23 December 1627, died 1687, married Elizabeth March
Children of William and Elizabeth Pett:
Elizabeth
Lucy
James, married to Frances (unknown maiden name), had son Phineas born ca. 1644
Peter of Wapping, Purveyor (1594), Shipbuilder (1631), Keeper of the Plank Yard (1615–1638), married 1st Ann, widow of ---- Tusam, 2nd Elizabeth, probably Berriman.
Children of Peter Pett of Wapping:
Peter of Deptford, Master Shipwright at Woolwich and Deptford 1629~52, inherited his father's shipyard at Ratcliffe, born 1592, died 1652, married Elizabeth Johnson
Children of Peter and Elizabeth Pett:
Phineas C., born 1635, died 1694, 3rd Commissioner at Chatham, Shipwright, whose son Phineas (died 1680, married Elizabeth (unknown maiden name), was 2nd Assistant Master Shipwright at Chatham
William, Clerk in Holy Orders at Cuxton, died 1651 in Devon
Elizabeth, married to Thomas Barwick
Ann
Mary, died 1668
Richard, of London
Lydia, died 1610
Children of Peter and Elizabeth (Thornton) Pett:
Jane Susannah, died 1567
Phineas, Shipwright, First HMD Commissioner at Chatham (1630–47), born 1570 at Deptford Stronde, died 1647, married 1st Ann Nicholls of Middlesex(died 1627; details of Phineas' children by Ann are found below) in 1598 at Stepney, 2nd Susan (Eaglefield) Yardley of Stratford le Bow (died 1637, widow of Robert Yardley, by whom she had three children) in 1627, 3rd Mildred (Etherington) Byland (died 1638) in 1638
Noah, died 1595
Peter, died 1600
Rachel, died ca. 1591, married Rev. W. Newman
Abigale, died 1599
Elizabeth, died 1599
Mary, died 1626, married (unknown given name) Cooper

Family 3
Peter Pett, born 1593, died 1652, Shipwright at Deptford, married Alice (unknown maiden name)
Children of Peter and Alice Pett:
Peter, Sir, Judge Advocate to Ireland, Member of Parliament, author, born 31 October 1630, baptised at Deptford, married Alice Newman of Chatham in 1658
Children of Sir Peter and Alice Pett:
Phineas, died 1674, married Rabsah (unknown maiden name, died 1662)
Children of Phineas and Rabsah Pett:
Charles, died 1662
Mary
James
Alice, born 1666
Phineas, Sir, Comptroller of His Majesty's Store Accounts, knighted 1680

Extension of Family 2
Children of Phineas and Ann Pett:
John, Captain, Royal Navy, lost in the ship Whelp, Kent, born 1601/2, died 1628, married Katherine Yardley (third daughter of Robert Yardley)
Children of John and Katherine Pett:
Phineas, Master Shipwright, Chatham, born 1628, died 1678
Henry, born 27 March 1603, died 1613
Richard, Shipwright at Chatham, born 1606, died 1629
Joseph, Shipwright at Chatham, born 1608, died 1627
Peter, Shipwright, 2nd Commissioner at Chatham (1647–1668), born 1610, died 1672, married 1st Katherine Cole, 2nd Mary Smith of Greenwich
Children of Peter Pett:
Ann, born 1612
Phineas, born 1615, died 1617
Mary, born 1617, baptised 22 April 1617, died 1617, twin sister of Martha
Martha, born 1617, died 1637, twin sister of Mary, married John Hoderne
Phineas, Captain, Royal Navy, killed in the ship Tiger, born 1610, died 1665, married Frances Carre
Children of Phineas and Frances Pett:
Phineas, Shipwright, born 1646, baptised ca. 1670, died 1694
Christopher, Sir, Master Shipwright, Woolwich and Deptford (1652–1668), born 1620, died 1668, married Ann (unknown maiden name, died 1679)
Children of Sir Christopher and Ann Pett:
Ann, died 1714, married in 1674 to Daniel Furzer (Master Shipwright, Chatham: 1698, Surveyor of the Navy 1699)
Children of Daniel and Ann Furzer:
Elizabeth Furzer, died 1751

References
THE BUILDERS OF THE NAVY, A GENEALOGY OF THE FAMILY OF PETT by H. Farnham Burke and Oswald Barron, from the public domain Google book The Ancestor (a magazine), A Quarterly Review of County and Family History, Heraldry and Antiquities, edited by Oswald Barron, F.S.A., Number X, July 1904. Published in London by Archibald Constable & Co., Ltd..
Samuel Smiles, Men of Invention and Industry (Harper & Brothers, New York, 1885. The chapter in this book is essentially extracted from the diaries of Phineas Pett and Samuel Pepys.

External links
 Phineas Pett: Beginnings of English Ship-Building
 Present day historical connections in Greater London
 An article explaining how two portraits previously thought to be of Sir William Monson and Peter Pett are probably of Phineas Pett, builder of the Sovereign of the Seas.

Pett